Bronislovas Genzelis (born 16 February 1934 in Aukštadvaris) is a Lithuanian politician. In 1990, he was among those who signed the Act of the Re-Establishment of the State of Lithuania.

References

External links
 Autobiography

1934 births
Living people
Lithuanian politicians
People from Trakai District Municipality
Signatories of the Act of the Re-Establishment of the State of Lithuania